Ekaterina Kovalchuk (born 20 December 1990) is a Belarusian footballer who plays as a goalkeeper for Belarusian Premier League club FC Minsk and the Belarus women's national team.

References

1990 births
Living people
Women's association football goalkeepers
Belarusian women's footballers
Belarus women's international footballers
FC Minsk (women) players